Nereid, or Neptune II, is the third-largest moon of Neptune. It has the most eccentric orbit of all known moons in the Solar System. It was the second moon of Neptune to be discovered, by Gerard Kuiper in 1949.

Discovery and naming 
Nereid was discovered on 1 May 1949 by Gerard P. Kuiper on photographic plates taken with the 82-inch telescope at the McDonald Observatory. He proposed the name in the report of his discovery. It is named after the Nereids, sea-nymphs of Greek mythology and attendants of the god Neptune. It was the second and last moon of Neptune to be discovered before the arrival of Voyager 2 (not counting a single observation of an occultation by Larissa in 1981).

Physical characteristics 
It is rather large for an irregular satellite. The shape of Nereid is unknown.
Nereid is similar in size to Saturn's moon Mimas, though Nereid is denser.
Since 1987 some photometric observations of Nereid have detected large (by ~1 of magnitude) variations of its brightness, which can happen over years and months, but sometimes even over a few days. They persist even after a correction for distance and phase effects. On the other hand, not all astronomers who have observed Nereid have noticed such variations. This means that they may be quite chaotic. To date there is no credible explanation of the variations, but, if they exist, they are likely related to the rotation of Nereid. Nereid's rotation could be either in the state of forced precession or even chaotic rotation (like Hyperion) due to its highly elliptical orbit.

In 2016, extended observations with the Kepler space telescope showed only low-amplitude variations (0.033 magnitudes). Thermal modeling based on infrared observations from the Spitzer and Herschel space telescopes suggest that Nereid is only moderately elongated with an aspect ratio of 1.3:1, which disfavors forced precession of the rotation. The thermal model also indicates that the surface roughness of Nereid is very high, likely similar to the Saturnian moon Hyperion.

Spectrally, Nereid appears neutral in colour and water ice has been detected on its surface. Its spectrum appears to be intermediate between Uranus's moons Titania and Umbriel, which suggests that Nereid's surface is composed of a mixture of water ice and some spectrally neutral material. The spectrum is markedly different from minor planets of the outer solar system, centaurs Pholus, Chiron and Chariklo, suggesting that Nereid formed around Neptune rather than being a captured body.

Halimede, which displays a similar gray neutral colour, may be a fragment of Nereid that was broken off during a collision.

Orbit and rotation 

The unusual orbit suggests that it may be either a captured asteroid or Kuiper belt object, or that it was an inner moon in the past and was perturbed during the capture of Neptune's largest moon Triton. If the latter is true, it may be the only survivor of Neptune's original (pre-Triton capture) set of regular satellites.

In 1991, a rotation period of Nereid of about 13.6 hours was determined by an analysis of its light curve. However, this determination was later disputed, and other researchers for a time failed to detect any periodic modulation in Nereid's light curve from ground-based observations. In 2016, a clear rotation period of 11.594 ± 0.017 hours was determined based on observations with the Kepler space telescope.

Exploration 
Prior to Voyager 2'''s arrival, observations of Nereid had been limited to ground-based observations that could only establish its intrinsic brightness and orbital elements. Although the images obtained by Voyager 2 do not have a high enough resolution to allow surface features to be distinguished, Voyager 2'' was able to measure the size of Nereid and found that it was grey in colour and had a higher albedo than Neptune's other small satellites.

See also 
 Moons of Neptune

References 

Moons of Neptune
Irregular satellites
19490501
Discoveries by Gerard Kuiper
Moons with a prograde orbit